William S. Allee (January 20, 1852 - October 9, 1916) was an American politician from Olean, Missouri, who served in the Missouri Senate.  He was elected in the general elections of 1909 and 1915.

References

1852 births
1916 deaths
People from Moniteau County, Missouri
Physicians from Missouri
American health care businesspeople
American surgeons
Democratic Party Missouri state senators
19th-century American politicians
19th-century American businesspeople